Mary Healy may refer to:

 Mary Healy (zoologist) (1953–2014), American zoologist, CEO and director of the Sacramento Zoo
 Mary Healy (entertainer) (1918–2015), American actress, singer, and variety entertainer
Mary Healy (Mother Gertrude) (1865–1952), Australian hospital administrator and member of the Sisters of Charity
 Mary Healy (theologian), Catholic professor and international speaker